Ricardo Salazar Martinez (born June 23, 1951) is an American attorney serving as the Senior United States district judge of the United States District Court for the Western District of Washington.

Early life and education
Martinez was born in Mercedes, Texas, and raised in Whatcom County, Washington, where he graduated from Lynden High School. He received a Bachelor of Science degree from the University of Washington in 1975 and a Juris Doctor from the University of Washington School of Law in 1980. He was an Assistant Prosecutor with the King County Prosecuting Attorney's Office in King County, Washington, from 1980 to 1990.

Career
Martinez was a judge on the King County Superior Court from 1990 to 1998. From 1998 to 2004, he served as a United States magistrate judge of the United States District Court for the Western District of Washington.

On October 14, 2003, Martinez was nominated by President George W. Bush to a new seat on the United States District Court for the Western District of Washington established by 104 Stat. 5089. Martinez was confirmed by the United States Senate on June 15, 2004, receiving his commission on June 16, 2004. He is the first Latino judge in the Western District of Washington. He served as the Chief Judge from February 6, 2016 to September 3, 2022. He assumed senior status on September 5, 2022.

Notable cases
Backpage, a classified advertising website specializing in online escort services, filed a lawsuit against the state of Washington to prevent a law that would require companies to verify the ages of people in sex-related advertisements. The online escort service claimed, "Backpage and Internet Archive argue the new law violates the Communications Decency Act of 1996, as well as the First, Fifth, and Fourteenth Amendments and the commerce clause of the U.S. Constitution." On 28 July 2012, Judge Martinez granted an injunction preventing the law from taking effect. In his ruling, Martinez found merit in some of Backpage.com's arguments that the state law would conflict with existing federal law.

See also
List of Hispanic/Latino American jurists
List of first minority male lawyers and judges in Washington

References

External links 
 
 Washington State Bar Association Diversity and Leadership Interview http://www.wsba.org/martinez.htm
 Oral history interview, 2005 Seattle Civil Rights and Labor History Project

|-

1951 births
Living people
Hispanic and Latino American judges
Judges of the United States District Court for the Western District of Washington
Superior court judges in the United States
United States district court judges appointed by George W. Bush
21st-century American judges
United States magistrate judges
University of Washington alumni
University of Washington School of Law alumni
Washington (state) state court judges
Lawyers from Seattle
People from Mercedes, Texas